The 1932 season was the Hawthorn Football Club's 8th season in the Victorian Football League and the 31st overall.

Fixture

Premiership Season

Ladder

References

Hawthorn Football Club seasons